The Cleveland Falcons were a professional ice hockey team in Cleveland, Ohio, that played home games in the Elysium Arena. The team was founded in 1929, as the Cleveland Indians as a member of the International Hockey League, where they played for five seasons, then renamed the Falcons. In 1936, the team transferred to the International-American Hockey League along with three other teams from the International Hockey League. After playing the 1936–37 season in the new league, they were renamed the Cleveland Barons, for the 1937–38 season.

Season-by-season results
 Cleveland Falcons 1934–1936 (International Hockey League)
 Cleveland Falcons 1936–1937 (International-American Hockey League)

External links
International Hockey League 1929–1936
CPHL (1927-1929) & IAHL (1929–1936)

Defunct American Hockey League teams
Falcons
Defunct ice hockey teams in Ohio
Ice hockey clubs established in 1934
Sports clubs disestablished in 1937
International Hockey League (1929–1936) teams